Lakmé is an Indian cosmetics brand, owned by Hindustan Unilever. It was named after the French opera Lakmé, which itself is the French word for goddess Lakshmi who is renowned for her beauty. It was started in 1952 as a 100% subsidiary of Tata Oil Mills, famously after Prime Minister Jawaharlal Nehru was concerned that Indian women were spending precious foreign exchange on beauty products and persuaded JRD Tata to manufacture them in India. Simone Tata joined the company as director and went on to become the chairperson.

Lakmé mainly sells coloured cosmetics products such as lipsticks, eyeliners and skincare cream. In December 2018, it launched its e-commerce platform. As of 2021, Lakmé also runs 485 beauty salons under Lakmé Lever. The company is the title sponsor for Lakme Fashion Week (LFW), a bi-annual fashion week which takes place in Mumbai.

Lakmé has Shraddha Kapoor, Kajol Devgn, Kareena Kapoor, and Ananya Pandey as brand ambassadors. In The Brand Trust Report 2012, Lakme was ranked 104th among India's most trusted brands and following year it was ranked 71st on the list. In 2014, Lakme was ranked 36th among India's most trusted brands according to the Brand Trust Report 2014.

References

Unilever brands
Indian brands
Companies based in Mumbai
Cosmetics brands
1952 establishments in Bombay State
Indian companies established in 1952
Manufacturing companies established in 1952